Anton Olegovich Tabakov (born 1960) is a Russian actor.

He is the son of fellow Russian actors Oleg Tabakov and Lyudmila Krylova.

As of 2005, he owned the Pilot Club, a nightclub in Moscow on Krasnaya Presnya in the former Zuyev Culture House.

Filmography
 Timur and His Team (1976)
Air Crew (1979)
Be My Husband (1982)
Time and the Conways (1984)
A Man from the Boulevard des Capucines (1986)
The Assassin of the Tsar (1991)
The Thief (1997)

References

External links

1960 births
Living people
Soviet male film actors
Russian male film actors
Russian male voice actors
Russian restaurateurs
Soviet male child actors
Russian Academy of Theatre Arts alumni
Male  actors from Moscow